Angel Guts: Red Classroom may refer to:

 Angel Guts: Red Classroom (film), a 1979 Japanese erotic film
 Angel Guts: Red Classroom (album), a 2014 album by Xiu Xiu